XMP  may refer to:

Computing
 Cray X-MP, a supercomputer
 Extensible Metadata Platform, an ISO standard for the creation, processing and interchange of metadata for all kinds of resources
 Extreme Memory Profile, information about a computer memory module, used to encode higher-performance memory timings

Gaming
 eXpanded MultiPlayer (U2XMP), the multiplayer expansion to Unreal II
 Unreal Tournament: Expanded Multiplayer (UT:XMP), a total conversion of expanded multiplayer for Unreal Tournament 2004
 Exotic matter pulse burster, a weapon in the game Ingress

Other uses
 Extremely Metal-Poor, stars, galaxies and related
 Xanthosine monophosphate, an intermediate in purine metabolism